Dengese (Lengese, Ndengese) is a Bantu language of northern Kasai-Oriental Province, Democratic Republic of the Congo.

References

Tetela languages
Languages of the Democratic Republic of the Congo